The SIGM400 is a family of firearms manufactured by SIG Sauer. The M400 is an air-cooled, direct impingement gas-operated, magazine-fed carbine that is based on the earlier AR-15 rifle. Depending on the variant, it can be chambered for 5.56×45mm NATO or .300 AAC Blackout cartridges, and may have a fixed or telescoping stock.

Design details

Operating mechanism
The SIGM400 is a semi-automatic firearm in either rifle as the SIGM400 Classic, SRP, Tread, Elite, Predator or pistol as the Elite PSB, intended for law enforcement, military and civilian markets. It fires from a closed bolt and uses a direct impingement gas system.

Features
The SIGM400 Predator is a rifle while the SIGPM400 Elite PSB is a pistol. There are California compliant ("featureless") models for both. The .300 AAC Blackout model is tailored specifically for efficient use with suppressors. The Picatinny rail supports optical, electro optical, or iron sights. SIG Sauer also manufactures suitable suppressors.

The SIGPM400 Elite PSB pistol is chambered for 5.56×45mm NATO with an  barrel and is chambered for .300 AAC Blackout with a  barrel. Both use a Pistol Stabilizing Brace accessory.

Users

 : Egyptian Special Forces Sa'ka , Navy Sa'ka And paratroopers
 : Iraqi Special Operations Forces use the SIG Sauer M400.
 : Oman Military use the SIG Sauer M400.
 : US Military, Philadelphia Police Department,  Detroit Police Department SWAT,  Franklin County, Ohio Police Department,  California Highway Patrol, Indiana State Police, Vermont State Police, Virginia State Police use the SIG Sauer M400.

See also
Heckler & Koch HK416
SIG Sauer SIG516
SIG MCX
M4 carbine

References

.300 BLK firearms
5.56×45mm NATO firearms
Assault rifles of Switzerland
Semi-automatic rifles
SIG Sauer rifles
AR-15 style rifles
Weapons and ammunition introduced in 2010